The 2017 Iowa State Cyclones football team represented Iowa State University in the 2017 NCAA Division I FBS football season. Competing as a member of the Big 12 Conference (Big 12), the team played its home games at Jack Trice Stadium in Ames, Iowa. They were led by second-year head coach Matt Campbell. They finished the season 8–5, 5–4 in Big 12 play to finish in a four-way tie for fourth place. They were invited to the Liberty Bowl where they defeated Memphis.

Previous season
The 2016 Iowa State Cyclones football team finished the regular season 3–9, with wins over non conference opponent, San Jose State and conference opponents Texas Tech and Kansas.  Allen Lazard received first team All-Big 12 honors and Kamari Cotton-Moya received second team All-Big 12 honors.

Personnel

Returning starters

Iowa State had 13 returning players on offense, 11 on defense and 5 on special teams that started games previously for the Cyclones.

Returning offensive starters

Returning defensive starters

Returning special teams starters

Roster

Recruiting class

Coaching staff

Schedule

Iowa State announced their 2017 football schedule on December 13, 2016. The 2017 schedule comprised six home and six away games in the regular season. The Cyclones will host Big 12 foes TCU, Oklahoma State, Texas, and Kansas and traveled to Baylor, Kansas State, Oklahoma, Texas Tech, and West Virginia. For non-conference games, the Cyclones traveled to Akron, as well as home games against in–state rivals UNI and Iowa. Originally Iowa State was scheduled to play Akron September 23 but that game was moved up to September 16.  They were also scheduled to open Big 12 play against Texas on September 30 but that was moved up to September 28.

Schedule Source:

Game summaries

Game 1: vs. Northern Iowa Panthers

Game 2: vs. Iowa Hawkeyes

Game 3: at Akron Zips

Game 4: vs. Texas Longhorns

Game 5: at Oklahoma Sooners

Game 6: vs. Kansas Jayhawks

Game 7: at Texas Tech Red Raiders

Game 8: vs. TCU Horned Frogs

Game 9: at West Virginia Mountaineers

Game 10: vs. Oklahoma State Cowboys

Game 11: at Baylor Bears

Game 12: at Kansas State Wildcats

Game 13: @ Memphis Tigers (Liberty Bowl)

Rankings

Awards and honors

References

Iowa State
Iowa State Cyclones football seasons
Liberty Bowl champion seasons
Iowa State Cyclones football